Shibam Hadramawt is a town in Yemen. With about 7,000 inhabitants, it is the seat of the District of Shibam in the Governorate of Hadhramaut. Known for its mudbrick-made high-rise buildings, it is referred to as the "Manhattan of the Desert" or "Chicago of the Desert".

History
The first known inscription about the city dates from the 3rd century CE. It was the capital of the Hadramawt Kingdom.

In the 20th century, it was one of the three major cities of the Qu'aiti Sultanate, the others being Al-Mukalla and Ash-Shihr.

The city was listed with the UNESCO World Heritage List, in 1982.

In 2008, a tropical cyclone flooded Shibam.

During the Yemen Civil War, the city suffered some damage after insurgents detonated a car bomb. There was also coalition bombing in the area. In 2015, UNESCO listed the city as "cultural heritage at risk".

Geography
The town is located in the central-western area of Hadhramaut Governorate, in the desert of Ramlat al-Sab'atayn. Its main road links Sana'a and other cities of western Yemen to the far eastern territories. The nearest towns are Seiyun, seat of an airport, and Tarim, both in the east. Another road, departing from the village of Alajlanya, in the west, links Shibam to Mukalla, the governorate's capital, located by the Indian Ocean.

Climate
Shibam has a hot desert climate (Köppen: BWh). January is the coldest month, with temperatures averaging .

Architecture

Overview
Shibam, which is now a UNESCO World Heritage Site, is known for its distinct architecture. The houses of Shibam are all made out of mudbrick, and about 500 of them are tower blocks, which rise 5 to 11 stories high, with each floor having one or two rooms. This architectural style was used in order to protect residents from Bedouin attacks. While Shibam has been in existence for an estimated 1,700 years, most of the city's houses originate from the 16th century. Many, though, have been rebuilt numerous times in the last few centuries.

Shibam is often called "the oldest skyscraper city in the world". It is one of the oldest and best examples of urban planning based on the principle of vertical construction. In order to protect the buildings from rain and erosion, the walls must be routinely maintained by applying fresh layers of mud. The city is surrounded by a fortified wall, giving it the name "the walled city of Shibam".

An edited photograph of Shibam was used as the skybox for the level Wet Dry World in the 1996 game Super Mario 64. Prior to the discovery, the image used for the level was previously believed to be a photograph of Casares in Spain.

Threats
The mudbrick buildings are frequently threatened by wind, rain, and heat erosion, and require constant upkeep in order to maintain their structures. The city was heavily affected by flooding from a tropical storm in 2008. The foundations of many of the buildings in the city were compromised by the flood waters, eventually leading to their collapse. It was also the target of an Al Qaeda attack in 2009.

In 2015, Shibam was added to the list of World Heritage Sites in danger when violent civil war erupted in Yemen. Historic buildings were significantly damaged during heavy bombing in Sana'a, and remain at risk from armed conflict.

Influences

The Dubai Global Village, an open-air shopping and entertainment complex in the United Arab Emirates, includes a Yemeni pavilion with mud-brick structures intended to evoke the architecture of Shibam.

The N64 videogame Super Mario 64 features a skybox image of the city in the Wet-Dry World, the eleventh world of the game. At first it was believed that this image, which appears as background of the world, was a panoramic photograph of the Spanish city of Cáceres.

Gallery

See also
 Marib
 Middle East
 Shabwah
 South Arabia

References

External links

 Shibamonline.net
 Shibam at Archnet.org
 World Heritage Site
 Official website of the Al-Quaiti Royal Family of Hadhramaut
 Shibam at TravelAdventures.org
 Shibam, Yemen – Ciudad de Tierra at YouTube
 Shibam at YouTube
 اليمن ـ شبام حضرموت (in Arabic)
 Shibam / Shabwa

Populated places in Hadhramaut Governorate
World Heritage Sites in Yemen
Archaeological sites in Yemen
Architecture in Yemen